Ammapalayam is a small village in Salem district, Tamil Nadu, India.  the 2011 Census of India, it had a population of 6,694	across 1,781 households.

References 

Villages in Salem district